Charlwood is a village in Surrey, England. 

Charlwood may also refer to:

 Charlwood (name), a surname and given name
 Charlwood, Hampshire, a hamlet in Hampshire, England
 Charlwood, Queensland, a locality in the Scenic Rim Region, Queensland, Australia
Charlwood House, a country house in West Sussex, England